Norberg Municipality (Norbergs kommun) is a municipality in Västmanland County in central Sweden. Its seat is located in the town of Norberg.

History 
The area, located within Bergslagen, the mining district of central Sweden, has historically been a mining area directed at iron. In the 1970s, archeological finds traced the blast furnace in Lapphyttan to the 12th century, predating the earlier known with 300 years.
 
In the 1390s, Engelbrekt Engelbrektsson was born on a farm outside the town Norberg. He was later to lead notable freedom-rebellions in 1434 against the King.

The coat of arms was created in 1948, and was formally granted and registered as a municipal arms with the municipal reform of 1971. The lower half corresponds to the arms of Engelbrekt Engelbrektsson: Three half lilies in a triangle; the upper half is the sign of iron.

Geography 
Geographically the town is situated by the small rivulet Norbergsån, around which its oldest part, including the 14th century Norberg Church and the Mill, are situated. Several houses are from the 18th century.

Twin towns – sister cities 

 Raasiku Parish, Estonia

References

External links 

Norberg Municipality - Official site

Municipalities of Västmanland County